Cattolica is a town and comune in the Province of Rimini, Italy, with 16,233 inhabitants as of 2007.

History
Archaeological excavations show that the area was already settled in Roman times.

Cattolica rose as a resting place for pilgrims who traveled the Bologna-Ancona-Rome route, on their way to the sanctuary of Loreto or to St. Peter's in Rome.
In 1500 it counted more than twenty taverns and inns. Only from the second half of the 19th century did the fishing industry became relevant in the economy of the town.

One of the first notable visitors to Cattolica's beach was Lucien Bonaparte, brother of the French Emperor, who preferred it to noisy Rimini, in 1823. The town became an independent commune in 1896.

After the end of World War I the tourism industry became predominant.

Main sights

Church of San Apollinare (13th century)
Torre Malatestiana (Malatesta tower) (1490)
Museo della Regina di Cattolica archaeological museum
S. Croce Gallery (16th century)
Watchtower (now included in a closed disco)
Le Navi, Aquarium of Cattolica

People 
 Cesare Pronti (1626–1708), painter
 Emilio Filippini (1870–1938), painter
 Guido Morganti (1891–1954), Righteous Among the Nations
 Egidio Renzi (1900–1944), martyr of Fosse Ardeatine
 Domenico Rasi (1924–1944), patriot
 Vanzio Spinelli (1924–1944), patriot
 Giuseppe Ricci,(1890-1972) politician
 Enrico Molari, motorcycle racer 
 Giovanna Filippini, politician
 Eraldo Pecci, (1955) footballer
 Alberta Ferretti (1950), fashion designer
 Umberto Paolucci (1944), Director of Microsoft Europe
 Vincenzo Cecchini (1934), painter
 Samuele Bersani (1970), singer
 Guido Paolucci (1932-2006), doctor
 Gianluca Magi, writer
 Marco Simoncelli (1987–2011), motorcycle racer
 Giampiero Ticchi (1959), basketball coach
 Andrea Cinciarini, basketball player
 Luca Leardini, pilot
 Niccolò Antonelli, motorcycle racer
 Mauro Piani (1959), yachtsman Azzurra

International relations

Cattolica is twinned with:
 Cortina d'Ampezzo, Italy
 Hodonín, Czech Republic
 Saint-Dié-des-Vosges, France
 Faches-Thumesnil, France
 Debrecen, Hungary

Events
 The feast of Stella Maris: fishing vessels and vongolaie leads in the midst of the sea, the statue of the Virgin Mary "Stella Maris", after a religious procession.
 The Festival of the flowers: since 1950s, Cattolica hosts a show of flower markets with many stalls along the streets of the city.
 The Pink Night, celebrated in town along the coast from Cattolica to Bellaria. It is a festival which is celebrated in June–July and is quite recent: the opportunity for all the shops, bars and restaurants adorn the premises of pink, with dancing to the beach and dive into the sea at midnight.
 The Fair of the ancient flavors of land and sea, with local wine tasting acoompagnate animations and concerts.
International Mystery Film Festival of Cattolica  (known in Italian as Festival internazionale del giallo e del mistero di Cattolica but internationally mostly known by its commonly used abbreviation "MystFest" (it).

References

External links 

Official website

Cities and towns in Emilia-Romagna
Towers in Italy